The Crowd was a charity supergroup formed specifically to produce a charity record for the Bradford City stadium fire, in which 56 people died on 11 May 1985. The group consisted of singers, actors, television personalities and others.

Gerry Marsden of Gerry and the Pacemakers had decided to make a charity record to aid the families of the victims of the disaster (the Bradford City Disaster Fund).  The re-recording of the 1963 number 1 hit song "You'll Never Walk Alone" from the Broadway musical Carousel, also a 'football anthem' for Liverpool supporters, entered the UK charts at No. 52, leaping to number 4 the following week and then reaching Number 1 on 15 June 1985. The record also topped the Irish Singles Chart. The single gave Gerry Marsden a 'first' in British recording history, by becoming the first person ever to top the charts with two versions of the same song.

Contributing musicians and celebrities
The band and celebrity members included: Sir Bruce Forsyth, Denny Laine, Jim Diamond, Tony Christie, Rick Wakeman, John Conteh, The Barron Knights, Jess Conrad, Kiki Dee, the Foxes, Rolf Harris, Graham Gouldman, Kenny Lynch, Rick Wild of The Overlanders, Keith Chegwin, Tony Hicks, Colin Blunstone, Tim Hinkley, Johnny Logan, Zak Starkey, Girlschool, Black Lace, John Otway, Gary Holton, Peter Cook, the Nolans, John Entwistle of The Who, Motörhead, Dave Lee Travis, Graham Dene, Ed Stewart, Phil Lynott, Smokie, Joe Fagin, Eddie Hardin, Gerard Kenny, Tim Healy, John Verity, Rose Marie, David Shilling, Chris Norman, Bernie Winters, Robert Heaton, and Frank Allen of The Searchers.

Paul McCartney contributed some words on the B-side of the record which was titled "Messages".

See also
Bradford City stadium fire
Bradford City A.F.C.

References

External links

1985 establishments in England
1985 disestablishments in England
Musical advocacy groups
Charities based in West Yorkshire
English pop music groups
Musical groups established in 1985
Musical groups disestablished in 1985
Charity supergroups
British supergroups